Le Verrier may refer to:

Notable people with the surname Le Verrier 
Urbain Le Verrier (1811–1877), a French mathematician who specialized in celestial mechanics
Max Le Verrier (1891–1973), French sculptor who specialized in Art Deco decorative objects.

Other uses 
Le Verrier (lunar crater)
Le Verrier (Martian crater)
1997 Leverrier, a main-belt asteroid
French frigate Le Verrier, a ship